100% may refer to:

Music 
 100% (band), a South Korean boy group

Albums
 100% (Angela Dimitriou album) or the title song, 1998
 100% (Beverley Knight album) or the title song, 2009
 100% (Lotta Engberg album) or the title song, 1988
 100%, by Alonzo, or the title song, 2017
 100%, by Jimsaku, 1993
 100%, by Negazione, 1990

EPs
 100% (Monogem EP) or the title song, 2017

Songs
 "100%" (Big Pun song), 2000
 "100%" (Lotta Engberg and Triple & Touch song), 1988
 "100%" (Mariah Carey song), 2010
 "100%" (Mary Kiani song), 1996
 "100%" (Senidah song), 2019
 "100%" (Sonic Youth song), 1992
 "100%" (Victor och Natten song), 2016
 "100%", by Angelspit from Krankhaus, 2006
 "100%", by DRAM from Big Baby DRAM, 2016
 "100%", by Moloko from Statues, 2003

Other uses 
 100% (comics), a 2002–2003 comic book by Paul Pope
 100% (game show), a 1997–2001 British game show
 1 (number)

See also 
 Percentage
 99% (disambiguation)
 1% (disambiguation)